Croom may refer to:

Places

Croom, County Limerick, a village in the Republic of Ireland
Croom, Maryland, an unincorporated place in the United States of America
Croom, New South Wales, a rural locality of Wollongong in Australia.

People

Croom (name)

See also

Croome (disambiguation)